The non-marine molluscs of Spain are a part of the molluscan fauna of Spain.

Non-marine molluscs of the Canary Islands are listed separately.

There are more than 300 species of non-marine molluscs living in the wild in Spain.

Freshwater gastropods 

Neritidae
 Theodoxus fluviatilis (Linnaeus, 1758)

Ampullariidae
 Pomacea insularum (d'Orbigni, 1835) - Invasive species

Viviparidae
 Cipangopaludina chinensis (J. E. Gray, 1833) - Invasive species
 Sinotaia quadrata (Benson, 1842) - Invasive species

Melanopsidae
 Melanopsis tricarinata dufouri
 Melanopsis penchinati Bourguignat, 1868
 Melanopsis praemorsa (Linnaeus, 1758)

Thiaridae
 Melanoides tuberculata (O. F. Müller, 1774) - Invasive species

Amnicolidae
 Bythinella andorrensis andorrensis (Paladilhe, 1874)
 Bythinella batalleri Bofill, 1925 - endemic to Spain
Bythinella batalleri batalleri Bofill, 1925 - endemic to Spain
Bythinella batalleri cuenca Boeters, 2019 - endemic to Spain
 Bythinella baudoni (Paladilhe, 1874)
 Bythinella espanoli Bech, 1980 - endemic to Spain
 Bythinella persuturata Bofill, Haas & Aguilar-Amat, 1921 - endemic to Spain
 Bythinella rolani Boeters, 2019 - endemic to Spain
 Bythinella servainiana (Paladilhe, 1870)
 Bythinella tajoensis Boeters, 2019 - endemic to Spain
 Bythinella tejedoi Boeters, 2019
 Bythinella ullaensis Boeters & Falkner, 2008 - endemic to Spain

Bithyniidae
 Bithynia kobialkai Glöer & Beckmann, 2007 - endemic to Mallorca and Ibiza
 Bithynia leachii (Sheppard, 1823)
 Bithynia majoricina Glöer & Rolán, 2007 - endemic to Mallorca
 Bithynia nakeae Glöer & Beckmann, 2007 - endemic to Mallorca and Ibiza
 Bithynia quintanai Glöer & Rolán, 2007 - endemic to Mallorca
 Bithynia tentaculata (Linnaeus, 1758)

Hydrobiidae
 Alzoniella asturica (Boeters & Rolán, 1988) - endemic to Spain
 Alzoniella camocaensis Rolán & Boeters, 2015 - endemic to Spain
 Alzoniella cantabrica (Boeters, 1983) - endemic to Spain
 Alzoniella edmunti (Boeters, 1984) - endemic to Mallorca
 Alzoniella elliptica (Paladilhe, 1874)
 Alzoniella galaica (Boeters & Rolán, 1988) - endemic to Spain
 Alzoniella iberopyrenaica Arconada, Rolán & Boeters, 2007 - endemic to Spain
 Alzoniella lucensis (Rolán, 1993)
 Alzoniella marianae Arconada, Rolán & Boeters, 2007 - endemic to Spain
 Alzoniella montana (Rolán, 1993) - endemic to Spain
 Alzoniella murita Boeters, 2003 - endemic to Spain
 Alzoniella onatensis Boeters, 2003 - endemic to Spain
 Alzoniella ovetensis (Rolán, 1993) - endemic to Spain
 Alzoniella pellitica Arconada, Rolán & Boeters, 2007
 Alzoniella rolani (Boeters, 1986)
 Alzoniella somiedoensis Arconada, Rolán & Boeters, 2009 - endemic to Spain
 Aretiana wolfi (Boeters & Glöer, 2007) - endemic to Spain
 Belgrandia boscae (J. M. Salvañá, 1887) - endemic to Spain
 Boetersiella davisi Arconada & Ramos, 2001 - endemic to Spain
 Boetersiella sturmi (Rosenhauer, 1856) - endemic to Spain
 Chondrobasis levantina Ramos & Arconada, 2001 - endemic to Spain
 Corbellaria celtiberica Callot-Girardi & Boeters, 2012 - endemic to Spain
 Corrosella andalusica (Delicado, Machordom & Ramos, 2012) - endemic to Spain
 Corrosella bareai (Delicado, Machordom & Ramos, 2012) - endemic to Spain
 Corrosella collingi (Boeters, Callot-Girardi & Knebelsberger, 2015) - endemic to Spain
 Corrosella falkneri Boeters, 1970 - endemic to Spain
 Corrosella herreroi (Bech, 1993) - endemic to Spain
 Corrosella hinzi (Boeters, 1986) - endemic to Spain
 Corrosella hydrobiopsis (Boeters, 1999) - endemic to Spain
 Corrosella iruritai (Delicado, Machordom & Ramos, 2012) - endemic to Spain
 Corrosella luisi (Boeters, 1984) - endemic to Spain
 Corrosella marisolae (Delicado, Machordom & Ramos, 2012) - endemic to Spain
 Corrosella navasiana (Fagot, 1907) - endemic to Spain
 Corrosella segoviana (Talaván Serna & Talaván Gómez, 2019) - endemic to Spain
 Corrosella tajoensis (Boeters, Callot-Girardi & Knebelsberger, 2015) - endemic to Spain
 Corrosella valladolensis (Boeters, Callot-Girardi & Knebelsberger, 2015) - endemic to Spain
Corrosella valladolensis kahbei (Boeters, Callot-Girardi & Knebelsberger, 2015) - endemic to Spain
Corrosella valladolensis valladolensis (Boeters, Callot-Girardi & Knebelsberger, 2015) - endemic to Spain
 Deganta azarum (Boeters & Rolán, 1988) - endemic to Spain
 Diegus gasulli (Boeters, 1981) - endemic to Ibiza
 Ecrobia atuca (Boeters, 1988) - endemic to Mallorca and Menorca
 Ecrobia vitrea (Risso, 1826)
 Guadiella andalucensis (Boeters, 1983) - endemic to Spain
 Guadiella arconadae Boeters, 2003 - endemic to Spain
 Guadiella ballesterosi Alba, Tarruella, Prats, Corbella & Guillén, 2009 - endemic to Spain
 Guadiella pilelongata Quiñonero Salgado, Martín Álvarez, López Soriano & Rolán, 2018 - endemic to Spain
 Guadiella ramosae Boeters, 2003 - endemic to Spain
 Hadziella leonorae Rolán & Pardo, 2011 - endemic to Mallorca
 Hydrobia acuta (Draparnaud, 1805)
 Iberhoratia sanromae Talaván Serna & Talaván Gómez, 2019 - endemic to Spain
 Islamia archiducis Boeters & Beckmann, 2007 - endemic to Mallorca
 Islamia ateni (Boeters, 1969) - endemic to Spain
 Islamia ayalga Ruiz-Cobo, Alonso, Quiñonero-Salgado & Rolán, 2018 - endemic to Spain
 Islamia globulus (Bofill, 1909)
 Islamia henrici Arconada & Ramos, 2006 - endemic to Spain
Islamia henrici giennensis Arconada & Ramos, 2006 - endemic to Spain
Islamia henrici henrici Arconada & Ramos, 2006 - endemic to Spain
 Islamia lagari (Altimira, 1960) - endemic to Spain
 Islamia pallida Arconada & Ramos, 2006 - endemic to Spain
 Islamia pistrini Ruiz-Cobo, Alonso, Quiñonero-Salgado & Rolán, 2018 - endemic to Spain
 Islamia seniaensis Alonso, Talaván-Serna, Ruiz-Jarillo, Quiñonero-Salgado & Rolán, 2021 - endemic to Spain
 Josefus aitanica Arconada & Ramos, 2006 - endemic to Spain
 Mercuria balearica (Paladilhe, 1869) - probably endemic to Menorca and Ibiza
 Mercuria bayonnensis (Locard, 1894)
 Mercuria similis (Draparnaud, 1805)
Mercuria emiliana is regarded as a synonym
 Milesiana schuelei (Boeters, 1981) - endemic to Spain
 Navalis edetanus Talaván-Serna, Quiñonero‐Salgado, Alonso & Rolán, 2021 - endemic to Spain
 Navalis perforatus Quiñonero-Salgado & Rolán, 2017 - endemic to Spain
 Plesiella guipuzcoa Boeters, 2003 - endemic to Spain
 Plesiella navarrensis Boeters, 2003 - endemic to Spain
 Potamopyrgus antipodarum J.E. Gray, 1843  - introduced
 Pseudamnicola artanensis Altaba, 2007 - endemic to Mallorca
 Pseudamnicola beckmanni Glöer et Zettler, 2007 - endemic to Mallorca
 Pseudamnicola granjaensis Glöer et Zettler, 2007 - endemic to Mallorca
 Pseudamnicola meloussensis Altaba, 2007 - endemic to Menorca
 Pseudamnicola moussoni (Calcara, 1841)
Pseudamnicola spirata (Paladilhe, 1869) and Pseudamnicola subproducta (Paladilhe, 1869) are regarded as synonyms
 Salaeniella valdaligaensis Boeters, Quiñonero-Salgado & Ruiz-Cobo, 2019
 Spathogyna fezi Arconada & Ramos, 2002 - endemic to Spain
 Tarraconia gasulli (Boeters, 1981) - endemic to Spain
 Tarraconia rolani Ramos, Arconada & Moreno, 2000 - endemic to Spain

Moitessieriidae
 Baldufa fontinalis Alba, Tarruella, Prats, Guillén & Corbella, 2010 - endemic to Spain
 Bythiospeum gloriae Rolán & Martínez-Ortí, 2003 - endemic to Spain
 Moitessieria aurea Tarruella, Corbella, Prats, Guillén & Alba, 2012 - endemic to Spain
 Moitessieria barrinae Alba, Corbella, Prats, Tarruella & Guillén, 2007 - endemic to Spain
 Moitessieria canfalonensis Corbella, Bros, Guillén, Prats & Cadevall, 2020 - endemic to Spain
 Moitessieria collellensis Corbella, Alba, Tarruella, Prats & Guillén, 2006 - endemic to Spain
 Moitessieria dexteri Corbella, Guillén, Prats, Tarruella & Alba, 2012 - endemic to Spain
 Moitessieria foui Boeters, 2003 - endemic to Spain
 Moitessieria garrotxaensis Quiñonero-Salgado & Rolán, 2017 - endemic to Spain
 Moitessieria guadelopensis Boeters, 2003 - endemic to Spain
 Moitessieria hedraensis Quiñonero-Salgado & Rolán, 2017 - endemic to Spain
 Moitessieria lludrigaensis Boeters, 2003 - endemic to Spain
 Moitessieria meijersae Boeters, 2003 - endemic to Spain
 Moitessieria mugae Corbella, Alba, Tarruella, Prats & Guillén, 2006 - endemic to Spain
 Moitessieria notenboomi Boeters, 2003 - endemic to Spain
 Moitessieria olleri Altimira, 1960 - endemic to Spain
 Moitessieria pasterae Corbella, Alba, Tarruella, Guillén & Prats, 2009 - endemic to Spain
 Moitessieria pesanta Quiñonero-Salgado & Rolán, 2019 - endemic to Spain
 Moitessieria prioratensis Corbella, Alba, Tarruella, Guillén & Prats, 2009 - endemic to Spain
 Moitessieria punctata Alba, Tarruella, Prats, Guillén & Corbella, 2010 - endemic to Spain
 Moitessieria robresia Boeters, 2003 - endemic to Spain
 Moitessieria seminiana Boeters, 2003 - endemic to Spain
 Moitessieria servaini (Burguignat, 1880) - endemic to Spain
 Moitessieria tatirocae Tarruella, Corbella, Prats, Guillén & Alba, 2015 - endemic to Spain
 Palaospeum hispanicum Boeters, 2003 - endemic to Spain
Palaospeum hispanicum hispanicum Boeters, 2003
Palaospeum hispanicum ondaense Boeters, 2003
 Palaospeum lopezsorianoi Quiñonero-Salgado & Rolán, 2017 - endemic to Spain
 Palaospeum septentrionale (Rolán & Ramos, 1996) - endemic to Spain
 Sardopaladilhia buccina Rolán & Martínez-Ortí, 2003 - endemic to Spain
 Sardopaladilhia distorta Rolán & Martínez-Ortí, 2003 - endemic to Spain
 Sardopaladilhia marianae Rolán & Martínez-Ortí, 2003 - endemic to Spain
 Sardopaladilhia subdistorta Rolán & Martínez-Ortí, 2003 - endemic to Spain
 Spiralix affinitatis Boeters, 2003 - endemic to Spain
 Spiralix asturica Quiñonero-Salgado, Ruiz-Cobo & Rolán, 2017 - endemic to Spain
 Spiralix burgensis Boeters, 2003 - endemic to Spain
 Spiralix calida Corbella, Guillén, Prats, Tarruella & Alba, 2014- endemic to Spain
 Spiralix clarae Quiñonero-Salgado, Ruiz-Cobo & Rolán, 2017 - endemic to Spain
 Spiralix cubelli Quiñonero-Salgado, López-Soriano, Alonso & Rolán, 2020 - endemic to Spain
 Spiralix gusii Quiñonero-Salgado, López-Soriano, Alonso & Rolán, 2020 - endemic to Spain
 Spiralix heisenbergi Quiñonero-Salgado, Alonso & Rolán, 2021 - endemic to Spain
 Spiralix miraensis Quiñonero-Salgado, Ruiz-Cobo & Rolán, 2017 - endemic to Spain
 Spiralix pequenoensis Boeters, 2003 - endemic to Spain
 Spiralix tuba Quiñonero-Salgado, Alonso & Rolán, 2019 - endemic to Spain
 Spiralix valenciana Boeters, 2003 - endemic to Spain
Spiralix valenciana castellonica Boeters, 2003 - endemic to Spain
Spiralix valenciana valenciana Boeters, 2003 - endemic to Spain
 Spiralix vetusta Quiñonero-Salgado, Alonso & Rolán, 2018 - endemic to Spain
 Tarracospeum raveni Quiñonero‐Salgado, Ruiz-Jarillo, Alonso & Rolán, 2021 - endemic to Spain

Valvatidae
 Valvata cristata O. F. Müller, 1774
 Valvata piscinalis (O. F. Müller, 1774)

Acroloxidae
 Acroloxus lacustris (Linnaeus, 1758)

Lymnaeidae
 Austropepla viridis (Quoy & Gaimard, 1833) - introduced
 Galba cubensis (Pfeiffer, 1839) - introduced
 Galba trunculata (O. F. Müller, 1774)
 Radix auricularia (Linnaeus, 1758)
 Radix balthica (Linnaeus, 1758)
 Stagnicola fuscus (Pfeiffer, 1821)
 Stagnicola palustris (O. F. Müller, 1774)

Physidae
 Physella acuta (Draparnaud, 1805)

Planorbidae
 Ancylus fluviatilis O. F. Müller, 1774
 Anisus spirorbis (Linnaeus, 1758)
 Anisus leucostoma (Millet, 1813)
 Ferrissia fragilis
 Gyraulus albus (O. F. Müller, 1774)
 Gyraulus laevis (Alder, 1838)
 Gyraulus crista (Linnaeus, 1758)
 Gyraulus chinensis (Dunker, 1848) - introduced species 
 Hippeutis complanatus (Linnaeus, 1758)
 Menetus dilatatus (A. Gould, 1841) - introduced species
 Planorbarius metidjensis
 Planorbella duryi (Wetherby, 1879) - introduced species 
 Planorbis planorbis (Linnaeus, 1758)
 Planorbis carinatus O. F. Müller, 1774
 Segmentina nitida (O. F. Müller, 1774)

Land gastropods 
Cochlostomatidae
Cochlostoma patulum fontqueri F. Haas, 1924 - endemic to Spain
Obscurella asturica Raven, 1990 - endemic to Spain
Obscurella bicostulata (Gofas, 1989) - endemic to Spain
Obscurella crassilabra (Dupuy, 1849)
Obscurella gigas (Gofas & Backeljau, 1994)
Obscurella hidalgoi (Crosse, 1864)
Obscurella martorelli (Bourguignat in Servain, 1880)
Obscurella martorelli esserana (Fagot, 1888) - endemic to Spain
Obscurella martorelli martorelli (Bourguignat in Servain, 1880)
Obscurella martorelli montsicciana (Bofill, 1890) - endemic to Spain
Obscurella oscitans (Gofas, 1989) - endemic to Spain
Obscurella partioti (Moquin-Tandon in Saint-Simon, 1848)

Pomatiidae
Leonia mamillaris mamillaris (Lamarck, 1822)
Pomatias elegans (O. F. Müller, 1774)
Tudorella ferruginea (Lamarck 1822) - endemic to the Balearic Islands
Tudorella mauretanica (Pallary 1898)

Carychiidae
 Iberozospeum bellesi (Gittenberger, 1973)
 Iberozospeum biscaiense (Gómez & Prieto, 1983) - endemic to Spain
 Iberozospeum costulatum Prieto & Jochum, 2021 - endemic to Spain
 Iberozospeum gittenbergeri (Jochum, Prieto & De Winter, 2019) - endemic to Spain
 Iberozospeum percostulatum (Alonso, Prieto, Quiñonero-Salgado & Rolán, 2018) - endemic to Spain
 Iberozospeum praetermissum (Jochum, Prieto & De Winter, 2019) - endemic to Spain
 Iberozospeum schaufussi (Frauenfeld, 1862) - endemic to Spain
 Iberozospeum suarezi (Gittenberger, 1980) - endemic to Spain
 Iberozospeum vasconicum (Prieto, De Winter, Weigand, Gómez & Jochum, 2015) - endemic to Spain
 Iberozospeum zaldivarae (Prieto, De Winter, Weigand, Gómez & Jochum, 2015) - endemic to Spain

Succineidae
 Oxyloma elegans (Risso, 1821)
 Oxyloma sarsii (Esmarck & Hoyer, 1886)
 Quickella arenaria (Potiez & Michaud, 1838)
 Succinea putris (Linnaeus, 1758)
 Succinea sp. - introduced species
 Succinella oblonga (Draparnaud, 1801)

Azecidae
Azeca goodalli (Férussac, 1821)
Cryptazeca elongata Gómez, 1990 - endemic to Spain
Cryptazeca monodonta (De Folin & Bérillon, 1877) - endemic to Spain
Cryptazeca spelaea Gómez, 1990
Cryptazeca subcylindrica De Folin & Bérillon, 1877
Hypnophila boissii (Dupuy, 1850)
Hypnophila malagana E. Gittenberger & Menkhorst, 1983

Cochlicopidae
Cochlicopa lubrica (O. F. Müller, 1774)
Cochlicopa lubricella (Porro, 1838)

Lauriidae
 Lauria cylindracea (Da Costa, 1778)
 Leiostyla anglica (A. Férussac, 1821)

Orculidae
 Argna ferrari (Porro, 1838)
 Orculella aragonica  (Westerlund, 1897) - endemic to Spain
 Sphyradium doliolum (Bruguière, 1792)

Valloniidae
 Acanthinula aculeata (O. F. Müller, 1774)
 Gittenbergía sororcula  (Benoit, 1859)
 Spermodea lamellata (Jeffreys, 1830)
 Vallonia costata (O. F. Müller, 1774)
 Vallonia enniensis (Gredler, 1856)
 Vallonia excentrica Sterki, 1893
 Vallonia pulchella (O. F. Müller, 1774)

Pupillidae
 Pupilla muscorum (Linnaeus, 1758)
 Pupilla triplicata (Studer, 1820)

Pyramidulidae
 Pyramidula jaenensis (Clessin, 1882)
 Pyramidula pusilla (Vallot, 1801)
 Pyramidula rupestris (Draparnaud, 1801)
 Pyramidula umbilicata (Montagu, 1803)

Chondrinidae
 Abida attenuata (Fagot, 1886)
 Abida bigerrensis (Moquin-Tandon, 1856)
 Abida cylindrica (Michaud, 1829)
 Abida gittenbergeri Bössneck, 2000
 Abida occidentalis (Fagot, 1888)
 Abida partioti (Saint-Simon, 1848)
 Abida polyodon (Draparnaud, 180l)
 Abida pyrenaearia (Michaud, 1831)
 Abida secale (Draparnaud, 1801)
 A.s. affinis (Rossmassler, 1839)
 A.s. andorrensis (Bourguignat, 1863)
 A.s. bofilli (Fagot, 1884) - endemic to Spain
 A.s. brauniopsis Altimira, 1963 - endemic to Spain
 A.s. brongersmai E. Gittenberger, 1973 - endemic to Spain
 A.s. cadica (Westerlund, 1902) - endemic to Spain
 A.s. cadiensis E. Gittenberger, 1973 - endemic to Spain
 A.s. elegantissima E. Gittenberger, 1973 - endemic to Spain
 A.s. ionicae Kokshoorn & Gittenberger, 2010 - endemic to Spain
 A.s. lilietensis (Bofill, 1886) - endemic to Spain
 A.s. margaridae Bech, 1993 - endemic to Spain
 A.s. meridionalis Martínez-Ortí, Gómez & Faci, 2004 - endemic to Spain
 A.s. merijni Kokshoorn & Gittenberger, 2010 - endemic to Spain
 A.s. peteri Kokshoorn & Gittenberger, 2010 - endemic to Spain
 A.s. secale
 A.s. tuxensis (Westerlund, 1902) - endemic to Spain
 A.s. vilellai Kokshoorn & Gittenberger, 20l0 - endemic to Spain
 Abida vasconica (Kobelt, 1882) - endemic to Spain
 Abida vergniesiana (Küster, 1850)
 Chondrina aguilari Altimira, 1967 - endemic to Spain
 Chondrina altimirai E. Gittenmberger, 1973 - endemic to Spain
 Chondrina arigonis (Rossmässler, 1859) - endemic to Spain
 Chondrina arigonoides Kokshoorn & Gittenberger, 2010 - endemic to Spain
 Chondrina ascendens (Westerlund, 1878)
 Chondrina avenacea avenacea (Bruguière, 1792)
 Chondrina bigorriensis  (Des Moulins, 1835)
 Chondrina calpica calpica (Westerlund, 1872)
 Chondrina cantabroccidentalis Somoza-Valdeolmillos & Vázquez-Sanz, 2021 - endemic to Spain
 Chondrina centralis (Fagot, 1892)
 Chondrina cliendentata E. Gittenberger, 1973 - endemic to Spain
 Chondrina dertosensis (Bofill, 1886) - endemic to Spain
 Chondrina farinesii (Des Moulins, 1835)
 Chondrina gasulli E. Gittenberger, 1973 - endemic to Spain
 Chondrina granatensis Alonso, 1974 - endemic to Spain
 Chondrina guiraoensis Pilsbry, 1918 - endemic to Spain
 Chondrina ingae Kokshoorn & Gittenberger, 2010 - endemic to Spain
 Chondrina jumillensis (L. Pfeiffer, 1853) - endemic to Spain
 Chondrina kobelti (Westerlund, 1887) - endemic to Spain
 Chondrina kobelti kobelti (Westerlund, 1887) - endemic to Spain
 Chondrina kobelti ordunensis Pilsbry, 1918 - endemic to Spain
 Chondrina kobeltoides E. Gittenberger, 1973 - endemic to Spain
 Chondrina maginensis Arrébola & Gómez, 1998 - endemic to Spain
 Chondrina marjae Kokshoorn & Gittenberger, 20l0 - endemic to Spain
 Chondrina massotiana (Bourguignat, 1863)
 Chondrina massotiana massotiana (Bourguignat, 1863)
 Chondrina massotiana sexplicata (Bofill, 1886) - endemic to Spain
 Chondrina pseudavenacea Kokshoorn & Gittenberger, 20l0 - endemic to Spain
 Chondrina ripkeni E. Gittenberger, 1973 - endemic to Spain
 Chondrina soleri Altimira, 1960 - endemic to Spain
 Chondrina tenuimarginata (Des Moulins, 1835)
 Granaria brauni (Rossmassler, 1842)
 Granaria brauni brauni (Rossmassler, 1842)
 Granaria brauni markusi Gittenberger & Ripken, 1993 - endemic to Spain
 Granaria variabilis (Draparnaud, 1801)
 Granopupa granum (Draparnaud, 1801)
 Rupestrella dupotetii (Terver, 1839)
 Rupestrella philippii (Cantraine, 1840) - Balearic Islands
 Solatopupa similis (Bruguière, 1792)

Truncatellinidae
 Columella aspera Waldén, 1966
 Columella edentula (Draparnaud, 1805)
 Truncatellina beckmanni Quintana, 2010
 Truncatellina callicatris (Scacchi, 1833)
 Truncatellina claustralis (Gredler, 1856)

Vertiginidae
 Vertigo angustior Jeffreys 1830
 Vertigo antivertigo (Draparnaud 1801)
 Vertigo arctica (Wallenberg, 1858)
 Vertigo genesii (Gredler, 1856)
 Vertigo moulinsiana (Dupuy 1849)
 Vertigo pusilla O. F. Müller, 1774
 Vertigo pygmaea (Draparnaud, 1801)
 Vertigo substriata (Jeffreys, 1833)

Enidae
Ena montana (Draparnaud, 1801)
Jaminia quadridens (O. F. Müller, 1774)
Mastus pupa (Linnaeus, 1758)
Merdigera obscura (O.F. Müller, 1774)
Zebrina detrita (O. F. Müller, 1774)

Bulimulidae
 Naesiotus quitensis (Pfeiffer, 1848) - introduced

Clausiliidae
Balea heydeni Maltzan, 1881
Balea perversa (Linnaeus, 1758)
Bofilliella subarcuata (Bofill, 1897)
Clausilia bidentata (Strøm, 1765)
Clausilia bidentata abietana Dupuy, 1849
Clausilia bidentata bidentata (Strøm, 1765)
Clausilia dubia dubia Draparnaud, 1805
Clausilia rugosa Draparnaud, 1801
Clausilia rugosa magdalenica Salvañá, 1887 - endemic to Spain
Clausilia rugosa parvulo (A. Férussac, 1807)
Clausilia rugosa penchinati Bourguignat, 1876
Clausilia rugosa reboudii Dupuy, 1850
Cochlodina laminata (Montagu, 1803)
Macrogastra attenuata lineolata (Held, 1836)
Macrogastra plicatula (Draparnaud, 1801)
Macrogastra rolphii (Turton, 1826)
Macrogastra rolphii digonostoma (Bourguignat, 1877)
Macrogastra rolphii rolphii (Turton, 1826)
Macrogastra ventricosa (Draparnaud, 1801)
Neniatlanta pauli (J. Mabille 1865)
Papillifera bidens (Linnaeus, 1758)

Ferussaciidae
 Cecilioides acicula (O.F Müller, 1774)
 Cecilioides connollyi Tomlin, 1943 - endemic to Gibraltar
 Cecilioides raphidia (Bourguignat, 1856)
 Cecilioides tumulorum (Bourguignat, 1856)
 Cecilioides veneta (Strobel, 1855)
 Coilostele akus Servain, 1880 - endemic to Spain
 Hohenwartiana disparata (Westerlund, 1891) - endemic to Spain
 Ferussacia folliculum (Schröter, 1784)

Achatinidae
 Rumina decollata (Linnaeus, 1758)
 Rumina saharica Pallary, 1901

Testacellidae
 Testacella haliotidea Lamarck, 1801
 Testacella maugei A. Férussac, 1819
 Testacella scutulum G.B. Sowerby I, 1821

Papillodermatidae
 Papilloderma altonagai Wiktor, Martín & Castillejo, 1990 - endemic to Spain

Punctidae
 Punctum pygmaeum (Draparnaud, 1801)
 Paralaoma servilis (Shuttleworth, 1852)

Helicodiscidae
 Lucillo singleyana(Pilsbry, 1890)

Discidae
 Discus ruderatus (W. Hartmann, 1821)
 Discus rotundatus (O.F. Müller, 1774)

Gastrodontidae
 Aegopinella epipedostoma (Fagot, 1879)
 Aegopinella minor (Stabile, 1864)
 Aegopinella nitidula (Draparnaud, 1805)
 Aegopinella pura (Alder, 1830)
 Retinella incerta (Draparnaud, 1805)
 Perpolita hammonis (Strøm, 1765)
 Zonitoides arboreus (Say, 1816) - introduced
 Zonitoides excavatus (Alder, 1830)
 Zonitoides jaccetanicus (Bourguignat, 1870) - endemic to Spain
 Zonitoides nitidus (O.F. Müller, 1774)

Oxychilidae
 Oxychilus alliarius (J .S. Miller, 1822)
 Oxychilus altimirai Riedel, 1972 - endemic to Spain
 Oxychilus anjana Altonaga, 1986 - endemic to Spain
 Oxychilus aracenensis Holyoak & Martín, 2022 - endemic to Spain
 Oxychilus basajauna Altonaga, 1990 - endemic to Spain
 Oxychilus beckmanni Falkner, 2007 - endemic to Mallorca
 Oxychilus cellarius (O.F. Müller, 1774)
 Oxychilus clarus (Held, 1838)
 Oxychilus courquini (Bourguignat, 1870) - endemic to Spain
 Oxychilus draparnaudi (H. Beck, 1837)
 Oxychilus lentiformis (Kobelt, 1882) - endemic to the Balearic Islands
 Oxychilus mercadali Gasull, 1968 - endemic to Spain
 Oxychilus navarricus (Bourguignat, 1870)
 Oxychilus pityusanus Riedel, 1969 - endemic to Ibiza and Formentera
 Oxychilus rateranus (Sevain, 1880) - endemic to Spain
 Morlina glabra harlei (Fagot, 1884)
 Mediterranea hydatina (Rossmassler, 1838)

Pristilomatidae
 Hawaiia minuscula (Binney, 1841) - introduced
 Vitrea contracta (Westerlund, 1871)
 Vitrea gasulli Riedel & Paul, 1978 - endemic to Mallorca and Ibiza
 Vitrea inae De Winter & Ripken, 1991 - endemic to Spain
 Vitrea striata Norris, Paul & Riedel, 1988 - endemic to Ibiza
 Vitrea subrimata (Reinhardt, 1871)

Euconulidae
 Euconulus alderi (Gray, 1840)
 Euconulus fulvus (O.F. Müller, 1774)

Milacidae
 Milax gagates (Draparnaud, 1801)
 Milax nigricans (Schultz in Philippi, 1836)
 Tandonia sowerbyi (A. Férussac, 1823)

Parmacellidae
 Drusia valenciennii (Webb & Van Beneden, 1836)

Agriolimacidae
 Deroceras agreste (Linnaeus, 1758)
 Deroceras altimirai Altena, 1969
 Deroceras ercinae De Winter, 1985 - endemic to Spain
 Deroceras hispaniensis Castillejo & Wiktor, 1983
 Deroceras invadens Reise, Hutchinson, Schunack & Schlitt, 2011
 Deroceras laeve (O.F. Müller, 1774)
 Deroceras levisarcobelum De Winter, 1986
 Deroceras lombricoides (Morelet, 1845)
 Deroceras nitidum (Morelet, 1845)
 Deroceras ponsonbyi (P. Hesse, 1884)
 Deroceras reticulatum (O.F. Müller, 1774)
 Deroceras rodnae Grossu & Lupu, 1965
 Deroceras tarracense Altena, 1969 - endemic to Spain
 Deroceras vascoana De Winter, 1986
 Furcopenis circularis Castillejo & Mascato, 1987
 Furcopenis darioi Castillejo & Wiktor, 1983 - endemic to Spain
 Furcopenis gallaeciensis Castillejo & Wiktor, 1983 - endemic to Spain
 Furcopenis geresiensis (Rodríguez, Castillejo & Outeiro, 1989)

Limacidae
 Ambigolimax valentianus (A. Férussac, l821)
 Gigantomilax majoricensis (Heynemann, 1863) - endemic to Mallorca and Menorca
 Limax cinereoniger Wolf, 1803
 Limax maximus Linnaeus, 1758
 Limacus flavus (Linnaeus, 1758)
 Malacolimax tenellus (O.F. Müller, 1774)
 Lehmannia marginata (O.F. Müller, 1774)
 Lehmannia rupicola Lessona & Pollonera, 1882

Vitrinidae
 Phenacolimax major (A. Férussac, 1807)
 Oligolimax annularis (S. Studer, 1820)
 Semilimax pyrenaicus (A. Férussac, 1821)
 Vitrina pellucida (O.F. Müller, 1774)

Arionidae
 Arion anthracius Bourguignat, 1886
 Arion baeticus Garrido, Castillejo & Iglesias, 1994 - endemic to Spain
 Arion fagophilus De Winter, 1986
 Arion flagellus Collinge, 1893
 Arion fuligineus Morelet, 1854
 Arion gilvus Torres Mínguez, 1925 - endemic to Spain
 Arion hispanicus Simroth, 1886
 Arion hortensis A. Férussac, 1819
 Arion intermedius Normand, 1852
 Arion iratii Garrido, Castillejo & Iglesias, 1995 - endemic to Spain
 Arion lizarrustii Garrido, Castillejo & Iglesias, 1995 - endemic to Spain
 Arion molinae Garrido, Castillejo & Iglesias, 1995
 Arion nobrei Pollonera, 1889
 Arion paularensis Wiktor & Parejo, 1989 - endemic to Spain
 Arion ponsi Quintana, 2007 - endemic to Menorca
 Arion rufus (Linnaeus, 1758)
 Arion subfuscus (Draparnaud, 1805)
 Arion urbiae De Winter, 1986 - endemic to Spain
 Arion wiktori Parejo & Martín, 1990 - endemic to Spain
 Geomalacus anguiformis (Morelet, 1845)
 Geomalacus maculosus Allman, 1843
 Geomalacus malagensis Wiktor & Norris, 1991
sometimes regarded as identical with Letourneuxia moreleti (Hesse, 1884) 
 Geomalacus oliveirae Simroth, 1891

Canariellidae
 Montserratina bofilliana (Fagot, 1884) - endemic to Spain
 Montserratina martorelli (Bourguignat, 1870) - endemic to Spain

Elonidae
 Elona quimperiana (Férussac, 1822)
 Norelona pyrenaica (Draparnaud, 1805)

Geomitridae
 Backeljaia camporroblensis (Fez, 1944) - endemic to Spain
 Backeljaia corbellai (Martínez-Ortí, 2011) - endemic to Spain
 Backeljaia gigaxii (Pfeiffer, 1847)
 Backeljaia najerensis (Ortiz de Zárate y López, 1950) - endemic to Spain
 Cernuella aginnica (Locard, 1894)
 Cernuella neglecta (Draparnaud, 1805)
 Cernuella virgata (Da Costa, 1778)
 Cochlicella acuta (O. F. Müller, 1774)
 Cochlicella barbara (Linnaeus, 1758)
 Cochlicella conoidea (Draparnaud, 1801)
 Helicella cistorum (Morelet, 1845)
 Helicella iberica (Rambur, 1869) - endemic to Spain
 Helicella itala (Linnaeus, 1758)
 Helicella ordunensis (Kobelt, 1883) - endemic to Spain
 Helicella orzai Gittenberger & Manga, 1981 - endemic to Spain
 Helicella stiparium (Rossmässler, 1854) - endemic to Spain
 Helicella striatitalla Prieto, 1985 - endemic to Spain
 Helicella valdeona Gittenberger & Manga, 1977 - endemic to Spain
 Microxeromagna lowei (Potiez & Michaud, 1838)
 Plentuisa vendia Puente & Prieto, 1992 - endemic to Spain
 Ponentina martigena (Férussac, 1832) - endemic to Spain
 Ponentina octoglandulosa Holyoak & Holyoak, 2012
 Ponentina papillosa Holyoak & Holyoak, 2012
 Ponentina revelata (Michaud, 183l)
 Trochoidea elegans (Gmelin, 1791)
 Trochoidea pyramidata (Draparnaud, 1805)
 Trochoidea trochoides (Poiret, 1789)
 Xeroplexa intersecta (Poiret, 1801)
Xerocrassa barceloi (Hidalgo, 1878) - endemic to Spain
Xerocrassa caroli (Dohrn & Heynemann, 1862) - endemic to Ibiza
Xerocrassa caroli alegriae Schröder, 1984 - endemic to islets off Ibiza
Xerocrassa caroli caroli (Dohrn & Heynemann, 1862) - endemic to Ibiza
Xerocrassa caroli conjungens (Jaeckel, 1952) - endemic to an islet off Ibiza
Xerocrassa caroli espartariensis Schröder, 1984 - endemic to islets off Ibiza
Xerocrassa caroli jaeckeli (Altimira, 1965) - endemic to an islet off Ibiza
Xerocrassa caroli scopulicola (Bofill i Poch & Aguilar-Amat, 1924) - endemic to  islets off Ibiza
Xerocrassa caroli vedrae (Jaeckel, 1952) - endemic to an islet off Ibiza
Xerocrassa caroli vedranellensis (Jaeckel, 1952) - endemic to an islet off Ibiza
Xerocrassa chiae (Fagot, 1886) - endemic to Spain
Xerocrassa cisternasi (Hidalgo, 1883) - endemic to Ibiza
Xerocrassa cisternasi calasaladae (Jaeckel, 1952) - endemic to an islet off Ibiza
Xerocrassa cisternasi calderensis (Gasull, 1964) - endemic to an islet off Ibiza
Xerocrassa cisternasi canae (Jaeckel, 1952) - endemic to an islet off Ibiza
Xerocrassa cisternasi cisternasi (Hidalgo, 1883) - endemic to an islet off Ibiza
Xerocrassa cisternasi hortae (Schröder, 1978) - endemic to an islet off Ibiza
Xerocrassa cisternasi margaritae (Jaeckel, 1952) - endemic to islets off Ibiza
Xerocrassa cisternasi mesquidae (Schröder, 1978) - endemic to an islet off Ibiza
Xerocrassa cisternasi muradae (Jaeckel, 1952) - endemic to an islet off Ibiza
Xerocrassa cisternasi ortizi (Gasull, 1964) - endemic to Ibiza
Xerocrassa cisternasi redonae (Jaeckel, 1952) - endemic to an islet off Ibiza
Xerocrassa claudinae (Gasull, 1964) - endemic to Mallorca
Xerocrassa cobosi (Ortiz de Zárate López, 1962) - endemic to Spain
Xerocrassa derogata (L. Pfeiffer, 1859) - endemic to Spain
Xerocrassa ebusitana (Hidalgo, 1869) - endemic to Ibiza and Formentera
Xerocrassa edmundi Martínez-Ortí, 2006 - endemic to Spain
Xerocrassa formenterensis Schröder, 1984
Xerocrassa frater (Dohrn & Heynemann, 1862) - endemic to Mallorca
Xerocrassa frater pollenzensis (Hidalgo, 1878) and Xerocrassa frater pulaensis Beckmann, 2007 are regarded as synonyms
Xerocrassa geyeri (Soós, 1926)
Xerocrassa grata (F. Haas, 1924) - endemic to Spain
Xerocrassa homeyeri (Dohrn & Heynemann, 1862) - endemic to Mallorca
Xerocrassa homeyeri homeyeri (Dohrn & Heynemann, 1862) - endemic to Mallorca
Xerocrassa prietoi (Hidalgo, 1878) and Xerocrassa prietoi muroensis Graack, 2005 are regarded as synonyms
Xerocrassa homeyeri ferrutxensis Forés & Altaba, 2014 - endemic to Mallorca
Xerocrassa homeyeri ponsi (Higalgo, 1878) - endemic to Cabrera south of Mallorca
Xerocrassa jimenensis Punte & Arrébola, 1996 - endemic to Spain
Xerocrassa lacipensis Torres Alba & Quintana Cardona, 2021 - endemic to Spain
Xerocrassa molinae (Hidalgo, 1883) - endemic to the Columbretes Islands
Xerocrassa montserratensis(Hidalgo, 1870) - endemic to Spain
Xerocrassa montserratensis betulonensis (Bofill, 1879) and Xerocrassa montserratensis delicatula (Bofill, 1898) were regarded as synonyms, but are genetically distinct and might represent subspecies
Xerocrassa newka (Dohrn & Heynemann, 1862) - endemic to Mallorca
Xerocrassa ferreri (S.H.F. Jaeckel, 1952) and Xerocrassa ferreri pobrensis (Gasull, 1964) are regarded as synonyms
Xerocrassa nyeli (Mittre, 1842) - endemic to Menorca
Xerocrassa cardonae (Hidalgo, 1867) is regarded as a synonym
Xerocrassa penchinati (Bourguignat, 1868) - endemic to Spain
Xerocrassa pollenzensis (Hidalgo, 1878) - endemic to Mallorca
Xerocrassa ripacurcica (Bofill, 1886) - endemic to Spain
Xerocrassa ripacurcica montsicciana (Bofill, 1890) - endemic to Spain
Xerocrassa ripacurcica oreina (Fagot, 1888)
Xerocrassa ripacurcica ripacurcica (Bofill, 1886) - endemic to Spain
 Xerocrassa roblesi Martnez-Ortí, 2000 - endemic to Spain
 Xerocrassa subrogata (L. Pfeiffer, 1853) - endemic to Spain
 Xerocrassa turolensis (Ortiz de Zárate López, 1963) - endemic to Spain
 Xerocrassa zaharensis (Puente & Arrébola, 1996) - endemic to Spain
 Xeroplexa setubalensis (L. Pfeiffer, 1850) - endemic to Spain
 Xerosecta adolfi (Pfeiffer, 1854) - endemic to Spain
 Xerosecta cespitum arigonis  (Schmidt, 1853)
 Xerosecta explanata (O.F. Müller, 1774)
 Xeosecta promissa (Westerlund, 1892)
 Xerosecta reboudiana (Bourguignat, 1863)
 Xerotricha apicina (Lamarck, 1822)
 Xerotricha bierzona (Gittenberger & Manga, 1977) - endemic to Spain
 Xerotricha conspurcata (Draparnaud, 1801)
 Xerotricha corderoi (Gittenberger & Manga, 1977) - endemic to Spain
 Xerotricha gasulli (Ortiz de Zárate y López, 1950) - endemic to Spain
 Xerotricha gonzalezi (Azpeitia Moros, 1925) - endemic to Spain
 Xerotricha huidobroi (Azpeitia Moros, 1925) - endemic to Spain
 Xerotricha jamuzensis (Gittenberger & Manga, 1977)
 Xerotricha madritensis (Rambur, 1868)
 Xerotricha silosensis (Ortiz de Zárate y López, 1950) - endemic to Spain
 Xerotricha zaratei (Gittenberger & Manga, 1977) - endemic to Spain
 Xerotricha zujarensis (Ortiz de Zárate y López, 1950) - endemic to Spain
 Xerotricha vatonniana (Bourguignat, 1867)
 Zarateana arganica (Servain, 1880) - endemic to Spain
 Zarateana rocandioi (Ortiz de Zárate y López, 1950) - endemic to Spain

Helicodontidae
 Atenia quadrasi (Hidalgo, 1885)
 Helicodonta obvoluta (O. F. Müller, 1774)

Helicidae
Allognathus graellsianus (Pfeiffer, 1848)
Allognathus hispanicus (Rossmässler, 1838)
Allognathus campanyonii (Rossmässler, 1839)
Arianta xatartii (Farines, 1834)
Cepaea hortensis (O. F. Müller, 1774)
Cepaea nemoralis (Linnaeus, 1758)
Cornu aspersum (O. F. Müller, 1774)
Iberus alonensis (Férussac, 1821)
Iberus campesinus (Pfeiffer, 1846)
Otala lactea (O. F. Müller, 1774)
Otala punctata (O. F. Müller, 1774)
Pseudotachea litturata (Pfeiffer, 1851)
Pseudotachea splendida (Draparnaud, 1801)
Theba andalusica Gittenberger & Ripken, 1987
Theba pisana (O. F. Müller, 1774)

Hygromiidae
 Ashfordia granulata (Alder, 1830)
 Ciliella ciliata (Hartmann, 1821)
 Cryptosaccus asturiensis Prieto & Puente, 1994 - endemic to Spain
 Cryptosaccus cabrerensis Holyoak & Holyoak, 2014 - endemic to Spain
 Euomphalía strigella ruscinica (Bourguignat, 1881)
 Hygromia cinctella (Draparnaud, 1801)
 Hygromia limbata (Draparnaud, 1805)
 Hygromia tassyi (Bourguignat, 1884)
 Ganula gadirana Muñoz, Almodóvar & Arrébola, 1999 - endemic to Spain
 Ganula lanuginosa (Boissy, 1835)
Mengoana jeschaui (Ortiz de Zárate, 1949) - endemic to Spain
 Monacha atacis Gittenberger & De Winter, 1985
 Monacha cantiana (Montagu, 1803)
 Monacha cantiana (Montagu, 1803)
 Portugala inchoata (Morelet, 1845)
 Pyrenaearia cantabrica (Hidalgo, 1873) - endemic to Spain
 Pyrenaearia carascalensis (Michaud, 1831)
 Pyrenaearia carascalopsis (Fagot, 1884)
 Pyrenaearia cotiellae (Fagot, 1906) - endemic to Spain
 Pyrenaearia daanidentata Raven, 1988 - endemic to Spain
 Pyrenaearia molae Haas, 1924 - endemic to Spain
 Pyrenaearia navasi (Fagot, 1907) - endemic to Spain
 Pyrenaearia oberthuri (Ancey, 1884) - endemic to Spain
 Pyrenaearia organiaca (Fagot, 1905) - endemic to Spain
 Pyrenaearia parva Ortiz de Zárate, 1956 - endemic to Spain
 Pyrenaearia velascoi (Hidalgo, 1867) - endemic to Spain
 Trochulus hispidus (Linnaeus, 1758)
 Zenobiellina graminicola D.T. Holyoak & G.A. Holyoak, 2018 - endemic to Spain
 Zenobiellina subrufescens (J. S. Miller, 1822)

Polygyridae
 Polygyra cereolus (Mühlfeldt, 1816) - introduced

Sphincterochilidae
 Sphincterochila baetica (Rossmässler, 1854)
 Sphincterochila candidissima (Draparnaud, 1801)
 Sphincterochila cariosula (Michaud, 1833)
Sphincterochila cariosula cariosula (Michaud, 1833)
Sphincterochila cariosula hispanica (Westerlund, 1886) - endemic to Spain

Trissexodontidae
 Caracollina lenticula (Ferussac, 1821)
 Gasullia gasulli (Ortiz de Zárate Rocandio & Ortiz de Zárate López, 1961) - endemic to Spain
 Gasuliella simplicula (Morelet, 1845)
 Hatumia cobosi (Ortiz de Zárate López, 1962) - endemic to Spain
 Hatumia zapateri (Hidalgo, 1870) - endemic to Spain
 Mastigophallus rangianus (Michaud, 1831)
 Oestophora barbella (Servain, 1880)
 Oestophora calpeana (Morelet, 1854)
 Oestophora dorotheae P. Hesse, 1930
 Oestophora ebria (Corbellá, 2004) - endemic to Spain
 Oestophora granesae Arrébola, 1998 - endemic to Spain
 Oestophora lusitanica (L. Pfeiffer, 184l)
 Oestophora mariae Ruiz, Arrébola & Puente, 2009 - endemic to Spain
 Oestophora ortizi De Winter & Ripken, 1991 - endemic to Spain
 Oestophora prietoi Ruiz, Arrébola & Puente, 2009 - endemic to Spain
 Oestophora silvae Ortiz de Zárate, 1962
 Oestophora tarnieri (Morelet, 1854)
 Oestophora urbionensis Prieto & Arribas, 2020 - endemic to Spain
 Oestophorella buvinieri (Michaud, 1841) - endemic to Spain
 Suboestophora altamirai (Ortiz de Zárate, 1962) - endemic to Spain
 Suboestophora boscae (Hidalgo, 1869) - endemic to Spain
 Suboestophora hispanica (Gude, 1910) - endemic to Spain
 Suboestophora jeresae (Ortiz de Zárate, 1962) - endemic to Spain
 Suboestophora tarraconensis (Aguilar-Amat, 1935) - endemic to Spain
 Trissexodon constrictus (Boubée, 1836)

Freshwater bivalves

Corbiculidae
 Corbicula fluminea (O. F. Müller, 1774) - Invasive species

Margaritiferidae
 Margaritifera margaritifera (Linnaeus, 1758)
 Pseudunio auricularius (Spengler, 1793)

Unionidae
 Anodonta anatina (Linnaeus, 1758)
 Potomida littoralis (Cuvier, 1798)
 Sinanodonta woodiana (I. Lea, 1834) - Invasive species
 Unio delphinus Spengler, 1793
 Unio gibbus Spengler, 1793
 Unio mancus Lamarck, 1819
 Unio ravoisieri Deshayes, 1848
 Unio tumidiformis Castro, 1885

Sphaeriidae
 Musculium lacustre (O. F. Müller, 1774)
 Sphaerium corneum (Linnaeus, 1758)
 Pisidium casertanum (Poli, 1791)
 Pisidium personatum Malm, 1855
 Pisidium amnicum (O. F. Müller, 1774)
 Pisidium henslowanum (Pfeiffer, 1821)
 Pisidium lilljeborgii Clessin, 1886
 Pisidium hibernicum Westerlund, 1894
 Pisidium milium Held, 1836
 Pisidium nitidum Jenyns, 1832
 Pisidium subtruncatum Malm, 1855

Dreissenidae
 Dreissena polymorpha Pallas, 1771 Invasive species

See also
 List of non-marine molluscs of the Canary Islands

Lists of molluscs of surrounding countries:
 List of non-marine molluscs of France
 List of non-marine molluscs of Andorra
 List of non-marine molluscs of Portugal
 List of non-marine molluscs of Morocco

References

Further reading 
  Arrebola Burgos J. R. & Alvarez Halcon R. M. (2001). "La explotación de los caracoles terrestres en España: aspectos ecológicos y socioculturales" [The exploitation of land snails in Spain: ecological and sociocultural aspects]. Temas de Antropología Aragonesa 11: 139–172. PDF
  Verdú J. R. & Galante E. (eds.) (2005). Libro Rojo de los Invertebrados de España [Red Book of Invertebrates of Spain]. Dirección General de Conservación de la Naturaleza, Madrid. .
  Verdú J. R. & Galante E. (eds.) (2009). Atlas de los Invertebrados Amenazados de España (Especies En Peligro Crítico y En Peligro). [Atlas of Threatened Invertebrates of Spain]. Dirección General para la Biodiversidad, Ministerio de Medio Ambiente, Madrid, 340 pp.

Spain
Molluscs
Spain
Spain